Friedhelm Wentzke (born 13 September 1935 in Castrop-Rauxel, Province of Westphalia) is a German sprint canoeist who competed in the early to mid-1960s. Competing in two Summer Olympics, he won two medals with a gold in the K-1 4 × 500 m (1960) and a silver in the K-4 1000 m (1964).

References

1935 births
Living people
People from Castrop-Rauxel
Sportspeople from Münster (region)
Canoeists at the 1964 Summer Olympics
German male canoeists
Olympic canoeists of the United Team of Germany
Olympic gold medalists for the United Team of Germany
Olympic silver medalists for the United Team of Germany
People from the Province of Westphalia
Canoeists at the 1960 Summer Olympics
Olympic medalists in canoeing
Medalists at the 1964 Summer Olympics
Medalists at the 1960 Summer Olympics